Middletown Public Schools is a school district in Middletown, Rhode Island.

Schools
 Middletown High School
 J. H. Gaudet Middle School (grades 5–8)
 J. H. Gaudet Learning Academy (grade 4), located at Gaudet Middle
Grades PK-3:
 Aquidneck Elementary School
 Forest Avenue Elementary School

In 2009, in consideration of a decline in enrollment and a reduced budget, the school district closed John F. Kennedy Elementary School.  Newport Public Schools sends preschool students to leased classrooms at Kennedy due to overpopulation at Claiborne Pell School in Newport.  Middletown Schools plans to reoccupy the building, so the arrangement with Newport will expire in 2021. In addition John F. Kennedy Head Start operates out of the facility.

References

External links
 Middletown Public Schools

School districts in Rhode Island
Middletown, Rhode Island
Education in Newport County, Rhode Island